Gene expansion may refer to:

Insertion (genetics)
Trinucleotide repeat, sometimes classified as a subgroup of insertions.